Canonto Lake is a lake in Frontenac County, Ontario, Canada.

See also
List of lakes in Ontario

References
 National Resources Canada

Lakes of Frontenac County